The 2012–13 Greek Football Cup was the 71st season of the Greek Football Cup. A total of 62 clubs, five more than the previous edition, were accepted to enter. The competition commenced on 24 October 2012 with the First Round and concluded on 11 May 2013 with the Final, held at Olympic Stadium. The final was contested by Asteras Tripolis and Olympiacos, with Olympiacos winning by 3–1 after extra time.

Teams

Calendar

Participating clubs
The following 62 teams competed in First Round:

Knockout phase
Each tie in the knockout phase, apart from the first two rounds and the final, was played over two legs, with each team playing one leg at home. The team that scored more goals on aggregate over the two legs advanced to the next round. If the aggregate score was level, the away goals rule was applied, i.e. the team that scored more goals away from home over the two legs advanced. If away goals were also equal, then extra time was played. The away goals rule was again applied after extra time, i.e. if there were goals scored during extra time and the aggregate score was still level, the visiting team advanced by virtue of more away goals scored. If no goals were scored during extra time, the winners were decided by a penalty shoot-out. In the first two rounds and the final, which were played as a single match, if the score was level at the end of normal time, extra time was played, followed by a penalty shoot-out if the score was still level.The mechanism of the draws for each round is as follows:
In the draw for the Round of 32, the teams from the first division are seeded and the winners from the previous rounds were unseeded. The seeded teams are drawn against the unseeded teams.

In the draws for the Round of 16 onwards, there are no seedings and teams from the different group can be drawn against each other.

First round

Summary

|-
|colspan="3" style="background-color:#D0D0D0" align=center|24 October 2012

|-
|colspan="3" style="background-color:#D0D0D0" align=center|25 October 2012

|}

Matches

Second round
The draw for this round took place on 13 October 2012.

Summary

|-
|colspan="3" style="background-color:#D0D0D0" align=center|30 October 2012

|-
|colspan="3" style="background-color:#D0D0D0" align=center|31 October 2012

|-
|colspan="3" style="background-color:#D0D0D0" align=center|1 November 2012

|-
|colspan="3" style="background-color:#D0D0D0" align=center|N/A

|}

Matches

Bracket

Round of 32
The draw for this round took place on 13 October 2012.

Summary

|}

Matches

Panthrakikos won 3–1 on aggregate.

Kavala won 1–0 on aggregate.

Skoda Xanthi won 5–4 on penalties.

Fostiras won on away goals.

Veria won 2–0 on aggregate.

Kerkyra won 2–0 on aggregate.

PAS Giannina won 3–0 on aggregate.

Match suspended at 87th minute while the score was 1–1.

Olympiacos won 5–0 on aggregate.

Levadiakos won 7–0 on aggregate.

PAOK won 5–2 on aggregate.

Olympiacos Volos won on away goals.

Apollon Smyrnis won 2–1 on aggregate.

Kallithea won 4–3 on aggregate.

Platanias won 4–1 on aggregate.

Asteras Tripolis won 4–1 on aggregate.

Panathinaikos won 6–1 on aggregate.

Round of 16
The draw for this round took place on 13 October 2012, after the Round of 32 draw.

Summary

|}

Matches

PAOK won 6–2 on aggregate.

Levadiakos won 3–1 on aggregate.

Olympiacos won 3–0 on aggregate.

Platanias won on away goals.

Veria won 4–1 on aggregate.

Panthrakikos won 5–2 on aggregate.

PAS Giannina won 5–2 on aggregate.

Asteras Tripolis won 3–1 on aggregate.

Quarter-finals
The draw for this round took place on 4 February 2013.

Summary

|}

Matches

Olympiacos won 3–0 on aggregate.

Asteras Tripolis won 5–2 on aggregate.

PAOK won 2–0 on aggregate.

Panthrakikos won 2–0 on aggregate.

Semi-finals
The draw for this round took place on 4 February 2013, after the quarter-final draw.

Summary

|}

Matches

Asteras Tripolis won 3–2 on aggregate.

Olympiacos won 8–3 on aggregate.

Final

References

External links
epo.gr

Greek Football Cup seasons
Cup
Greek Cup